The mixed team relay of the 2022 UCI Road World Championships was a cycling event that took place on 21 September 2022 in Wollongong, Australia

Final classification

References

Mixed team relay
UCI Road World Championships – Mixed team relay